An anal piercing is a body piercing in the surrounding area of the human anus, usually the perineum.

Despite the name, piercing of the anal sphincter itself is rather rare, because even once the wound canal has healed, piercings through a functioning muscle in as sensitive an area as the anus tend to remain painful and prone to tearing.

Even more-so, a new piercing in this area is exceedingly difficult to keep from safe from infection, because of the constant presence of fecal matter.

References

External links
Anal piercing @ BMEZine Wiki

Body piercing
Anal eroticism